Børre Dalhaug (born 29 April 1974 in Ålesund, Norway) is a Norwegian jazz musician (drums), music arranger and music instructor.

Career 
Dalhaug has worked as a musician since 1995 and done around 800 concerts with bands like The Real Thing, Staffan William-Olsson Sextet, Nora Brockstedt, Oslo Groove Company, Bohuslän Big Band among others. He has performed in Pakistan, India, Russia, France, Germany, Finland, Sweden and Denmark and participates on a number of albums.

He released the Spellemannprisen nominated big band album BigBandBlast! (2004), and leads his own big band called «Børre Dalhaugs Bigbandblast» in addition to being a sideman in numerous projects. Børre also works as a composer and arranger. He also has a college degree in computer engineering.

Discography

Solo albums 
2004: Bigbandblast! (Real Records), «Børre Dalhaugs Bigbandblast» includes Kåre Nymark Jr., Nils-Olav Johansen, Stian Carstensen & Palle Wagnberg

Collaborative works 
Within The Real Thing
2000: Deluxe (Real Music Records), with Even Kruse Skatrud and the Norwegian Radio Orchestra
2003: New Wrapping (Real Music Records)
2006: A Real Christmas (Real Music Records), feat. vocalist Sigrid Brennhaug

With other projects
2000: Oak Road Boogaloo (Real Music Records), within Staffan William-Olsson Sextet
2005: Eveneven Big Band (Schmell), with Even Kruse Skatrud & «Eveneven Big Band»

References

External links
 
 The Real Thing
 Presto

1974 births
Living people
Musicians from Ålesund
20th-century Norwegian drummers
21st-century Norwegian drummers
Norwegian jazz drummers
Male drummers
Jazz bandleaders
20th-century drummers
20th-century Norwegian male musicians
21st-century Norwegian male musicians
Male jazz musicians
The Real Thing (Norwegian band) members